Year's Best SF 11 is a science fiction anthology edited by David G. Hartwell and Kathryn Cramer that was published in 2006.  It is the eleventh in the Year's Best SF series.

Contents

The book itself, as well as each of the stories, has a short
introduction by the editors.

David Langford: "New Hope for the Dead" (Originally in Nature, 2005)
Hannu Rajaniemi: "Deus Ex Homine" (Originally in Nova Scotia: New Scottish Speculative Fiction, 2005)
Gardner R. Dozois: "When the Great Days Came" (Originally in F&SF, 2005)
 Daryl Gregory: "Second Person, Present Tense" (Originally in Asimov's, 2005)
Justina Robson: "Dreadnought" (Originally in Nature, 2005)
Ken MacLeod: "A Case of Consilience" (Originally in Nova Scotia, 2005)
Tobias S. Buckell: "Toy Planes" (Originally in Nature, 2005)
Neal Asher: "Mason's Rats" (Originally in Asimov's, 2005)
Vonda N. McIntyre: "A Modest Proposal" (Originally in Nature, 2005)
Rudy Rucker: "Guadalupe and Hieronymus Bosch" (Originally in Interzone, 2005)
Peter F. Hamilton: "The Forever Kitten" (Originally in Nature, 2005)
 Matthew Jarpe: "City of Reason" (Originally in Asimov's, 2005)
Bruce Sterling: "Ivory Tower" (Originally in Nature, 2005)
 Lauren McLaughlin: "Sheila" (Originally in Interzone, 2005)
Paul McAuley: "Rats of the System" (Originally in Constellations, 2005)
Larissa Lai: "I Love Liver: A Romance" (Originally in Nature, 2005)
James Patrick Kelly: "The Edge of Nowhere" (Originally in Asimov's, 2005)
Ted Chiang: "What's Expected of Us" (Originally in Nature, 2005)
Michael Swanwick: "Girls and Boys, Come Out to Play" (Originally in Asimov's, 2005)
Stephen Baxter: "Lakes of Light" (Originally in Constellations, 2005)
Oliver Morton: "The Albian Message" (Originally in Nature, 2005)
Bud Sparhawk: "Bright Red Star" (Originally in Asimov's, 2005)
 Alaya Dawn Johnson: "Third Day Lights" (Originally in Interzone, 2005)
Greg Bear: "Ram Shift Phase 2" (Originally in Nature, 2005)
Gregory Benford: "On the Brane" (Originally in Gateways, 2005)
R. Garcia y Robertson: "Oxygen Rising" (Originally in Asimov's, 2005)
Adam Roberts: "And Future King..." (Originally in Postscripts, 2005)
Alastair Reynolds: "Beyond the Aquila Rift" (Originally in Constellations, 2005)
Joe Haldeman: "Angel of Light" (Originally in Cosmos, 2005)
Liz Williams: "Ikiryoh" (Originally in Asimov's, 2005)
Cory Doctorow: "I, Robot" (Originally in The Infinite Matrix, 2005)

External links

 The Infinite Matrix

2006 anthologies
Year's Best SF anthology series
Eos Books books
2000s science fiction works